Caligari may refer to:

Dr. Caligari, a major character in the 1920 film The Cabinet of Dr. Caligari
Caligari Corporation, an American software company acquired by Microsoft
"Caligari's Mirror", a song from the album Dub Housing by the American music group Pere Ubu
John Caligari (born 1960), a lieutenant general in the Australian Army
Caligari Carnival, the setting of the ninth book of A Series of Unfortunate Events

See also
Calegari
Cagliari
Caligaris, a surname